The 1993 Virginia Slims of Chicago was a women's tennis tournament played on indoor carpet courts at the UIC Pavilion in Chicago, Illinois in the United States that was part of Tier II of the 1993 WTA Tour. The tournament was held from February 8 through February 14, 1993. First-seeded Monica Seles won the singles title and earned $75,000 first-prize money.

Finals

Singles

 Monica Seles defeated  Martina Navratilova 3–6, 6–2, 6–1
 It was Seles' 2nd singles title of the year and the 32nd of her career.

Doubles

 Katrina Adams /  Zina Garrison-Jackson defeated  Amy Frazier /  Kimberly Po 7–6(9–7), 6–3

Prize money 

* per team

References

External links
 International Tennis Federation (ITF) tournament edition details
 Tournament draws

Virginia Slims of Chicago
Ameritech Cup
February 1993 sports events in the United States
1993 in sports in Illinois
1993 in American tennis